Gmür is a surname. Notable people with the surname include:

 Chiara Gmür (born 1993), Swiss alpine skier
 Felix Gmür (born 1966), Swiss Roman Catholic bishop
 Hans Gmür (1927–2004), Swiss theater director
 Martina Gmür (born 1979), Swiss visual artist
 Philipp Gmür (born 1963), Swiss lawyer
 Théo Gmür (born 1996), Swiss alpine skier

See also